Ware Shoals Inn is a historic hotel located at Ware Shoals, Greenwood County, South Carolina.  It was built by the Ware Shoals Manufacturing Company in 1923, and is a three-story brick building with a partial basement. The modified V-shaped building features a raised porch at its truncated vertex.  The Inn's design incorporates elements of the Arts and Crafts movement and Colonial Revival style.

It was listed on the National Register of Historic Places in 2007.

References

Hotel buildings on the National Register of Historic Places in South Carolina
Colonial Revival architecture in South Carolina
Buildings and structures completed in 1923
National Register of Historic Places in Greenwood County, South Carolina
Buildings and structures in Greenwood County, South Carolina